Thirteen teams took part in the 1954 Soviet national football league with FC Dynamo Moscow winning the title.

League standings

Results

Top scorers
11 goals
 Anatoli Ilyin (Spartak Moscow)
 Vladimir Ilyin (Dynamo Moscow)
 Antonin Sochnev (Trudovyye Rezervy Leningrad)

10 goals
 Avtandil Gogoberidze (Dinamo Tbilisi)
 Mykhaylo Koman (Dynamo Kiev)

9 goals
 Vitali Vatskevich (Torpedo Moscow)

8 goals
 Gennadi Bondarenko (Dynamo Moscow)
 Nikolai Yefimov (Torpedo Gorky)
 Viktor Voroshilov (Krylia Sovetov Kuybyshev)

7 goals
 Nikolai Dementyev (Spartak Moscow)
 Valentin Ivanov (Torpedo Moscow)
 Aleksandr Kotrikadze (Dinamo Tbilisi)
 Boris Tatushin (Spartak Moscow)
 Anatoli Yegorov (Spartak Moscow)

References

 Soviet Union - List of final tables (RSSSF)

1954
1
Soviet
Soviet